Ibrahim Olawoyin (born 1 December 1997) is a Nigerian international footballer who plays as a winger for TFF First League club Çaykur Rizespor.

Club career
Olawoyin played his first-ever game in the Nigerian Professional Football League on January 13, 2019 for his former side Abia Warriors. They lost 0-1 at Nasarawa United. He went ahead to start twenty-one out of the twenty-two games in that season's abridged league. Olawoyin scored three goals for Warriors in the league that season; against Yobe Desert Stars, Ifeanyi Ubah and Heartland, contributing up to ten assists in the league. Olawoyin's consistency attracted interests from Lobi Stars and Rangers International but the winger opted to join the latter. He made his competitive debut in Rangers' 1-2 loss to AS Pelican of Gabon in a CAF Confederation Cup game in Gaborone. He played for 75 minutes in the game. He made his home debut in the return leg, scoring the decisive 3rd goal which qualified Rangers for the next round.

After making over 40 appearances in all competitions for Rangers International, Olawoyin moved to Ankara Keçiörengücü in August, 2021. Olawoyin made his debut in his side's 2-0 win over Adanaspor.

In his seventh appearance for the club, Olawoyin scored a brace to lead his side to a 3-2 win over visiting Istanbulspor.

Career statistics

International

References

1997 births
Sportspeople from Lagos
Living people
Nigerian footballers
Nigeria international footballers
Association football forwards
Abia Warriors F.C. players
Rangers International F.C. players
Ankara Keçiörengücü S.K. footballers
Nigeria Professional Football League players
TFF First League players
Nigerian expatriate footballers
Expatriate footballers in Turkey
Nigerian expatriate sportspeople in Turkey